The 2007–08 season was Chelsea Football Club's 94th competitive season, 16th consecutive season in the Premier League, and 102nd year as a club. Manager José Mourinho left the club by mutual consent on 20 September 2007 following a disappointing 1–1 draw with Rosenborg and was replaced by the Israeli Avram Grant.

The 2007–08 Premier League season was decided on the last day of the season, when Chelsea needed to win against Bolton Wanderers and Manchester United to either draw or lose against Wigan Athletic. Chelsea drew 1–1 and Manchester United won 2–0, thus making Chelsea runners-up to United for the second consecutive season.

Chelsea played in their first UEFA Champions League Final, against Manchester United, making it the first all-English final in the competition's history. After extra time the score was 1–1; Manchester United won the penalty shootout 6–5 after Edwin van der Sar saved Nicolas Anelka's penalty.

Chelsea went the entire 2007–08 campaign without suffering a single defeat at home. In spite of this, this was the first season in four years that Chelsea had finished the season without a trophy; the lack of silverware led to Avram Grant being sacked three days after the Champions League final. Five days later, Chelsea's assistant first-team coach, Henk ten Cate, had his contract terminated as well.

Kits
Supplier: Adidas / Sponsor: Samsung Mobile

Squad

Left club during season

Reserve squad

Transfers

In

Out

Overall transfer activity

Total Spending
Summer:  £19,000,000

Winter:  £24,700,000

Total:  £43,700,000

Income
Summer:  £25,000,000

Winter:  £0,000,000

Total:  £25,000,000

Expenditure
Summer:  £6,000,000

Winter:  £24,700,000

Total:  £18,700,000

Club

Management

{|class="wikitable"
|-
!Position
!Staff
|-
|rowspan="2"|Managers|| José Mourinho (until 20 September)
|-
| Avram Grant (20 September–24 May)
|-
|rowspan="3"|Assistant managers|| Steve Clarke
|-
| Avram Grant (until 20 September)
|-
| Henk ten Cate (20 September–29 May)
|-
||Goalkeeping coach|| Christophe Lollichon
|-
|Head scout|| Michael Emenalo
|-
|Club doctor|| Dr. Bryan English
|-
|Chief scout and director of youth development|| Frank Arnesen
|-
|Reserve team manager|| Brendan Rodgers
|-
|Youth team manager|| Paul Clement
|-
|Academy manager|| Neil Bath

Other information

Pre-season

Competitions

FA Community Shield

Premier League

Classification

Results summary

Results by round

Matches

UEFA Champions League

Group stage

Knockout phase

Round of 16

Quarter-finals

Semi-finals

Final

Disciplinary record

Football League Cup

Disciplinary record

FA Cup

Disciplinary record

Statistics

Appearances and goals

|-
! colspan=16 style=background:#dcdcdc; text-align:center| Goalkeepers

|-
! colspan=16 style=background:#dcdcdc; text-align:center| Defenders

|-
! colspan=16 style=background:#dcdcdc; text-align:center| Midfielders

|-
! colspan=16 style=background:#dcdcdc; text-align:center| Forwards

|-
! colspan=16 style=background:#dcdcdc; text-align:center| Players transferred out during the season

References

External links
 Chelsea FC official website
 Chelsea FC on Soccerbase
 UEFA Champions League

Chelsea F.C. seasons
Chelsea